The 1972–73 Seattle SuperSonics season was the 6th season of the Seattle SuperSonics in the National Basketball Association (NBA). The team finished the regular season in 6th place in the Western Conference with a 26–56 record, 21 wins behind the one obtained in their previous season. Head coach Tom Nissalke was fired by the team in January after a 13–32 start and was replaced by his assistant Bucky Buckwalter.

Offseason
The offseason trade that sent player-coach Lenny Wilkens to the Cleveland Cavaliers was received with shock from fans and the player himself. The trade also sent Barry Clemens to the Cavaliers and brought All-Star Butch Beard to the Sonics.

The signing of free agent John Brisker cost the SuperSonics a $10,000 fine and the resignation of their 1973 first round draft pick to the Philadelphia 76ers for violation of league rules that prohibited the team to approach Brisker without contacting the Sixers, who selected him in a supplemental draft in 1969 and held the rights to the player. However, Seattle regained its first round pick after an appeal and the Sonics' second round selection was given to the 76ers.

Draft picks

Note: only draft picks who participated in at least one game in the NBA are listed.

Roster

Depth chart

Regular season

Season standings

Record vs. opponents

Game log

|- bgcolor=#fcc
| 1
| October 10
| @ New York
| L 89–113
| John Brisker (16)
|
|
| Madison Square Garden 19,447
| 0–1
|- bgcolor=#cfc
| 2
| October 11
| @ Philadelphia
| W 105–100
| Spencer Haywood (22)
|
|
| The Spectrum 6,257
| 1–1
|- bgcolor=#cfc
| 3
| October 13
| @ Portland
| W 92–84
| Spencer Haywood (35)
|
|
| Memorial Coliseum 8,573
| 2–1
|- bgcolor=#fcc
| 4
| October 20
| Golden State
| L 92–101
| Spencer Haywood (22)
|
|
| Seattle Center Coliseum 10,950
| 2–2
|- bgcolor=#fcc
| 5
| October 21
| @ Phoenix
| L 117–129
| John Brisker (34)
|
|
| Arizona Veterans Memorial Coliseum 8,315
| 2–3
|- bgcolor=#cfc
| 6
| October 22
| Portland
| W 120–119 (OT)
| John Brisker (30)
|
|
| Seattle Center Coliseum 6,925
| 3–3
|- bgcolor=#fcc
| 7
| October 25
| Atlanta
| L 115–118
| Spencer Haywood (33)
|
|
| Seattle Center Coliseum 7,140
| 3–4
|- bgcolor=#cfc
| 8
| October 27
| Phoenix
| W 120–115
| Dick Snyder (29)
|
|
| Seattle Center Coliseum 8,201
| 4–4
|- bgcolor=#fcc
| 9
| October 29
| Chicago
| L 94–95
| Spencer Haywood (30)
|
|
| Seattle Center Coliseum 8,022
| 4–5

|- bgcolor=#fcc
| 10
| November 1
| Detroit
| L 106–116
| John Brisker (33)
|
|
| Seattle Center Coliseum 6,005
| 4–6
|- bgcolor=#fcc
| 11
| November 3
| New York
| L 80–105
| Spencer Haywood (18)
|
|
| Seattle Center Coliseum 10,031
| 4–7
|- bgcolor=#fcc
| 12
| November 5
| Los Angeles
| L 115–124
| Spencer Haywood (30)
|
|
| Seattle Center Coliseum 11,250
| 4–8
|- bgcolor=#fcc
| 13
| November 8
| @ Milwaukee
| L 103–116
| Spencer Haywood (29)
|
|
| Milwaukee Arena7,378
| 4–9
|- bgcolor=#fcc
| 14
| November 10
| Kansas City–Omaha
| L 106–111
| Spencer Haywood (38)
|
|
| Seattle Center Coliseum 8,156
| 4–10
|- bgcolor=#fcc
| 15
| November 12
| Cleveland
| L 107–113
| Spencer Haywood (28)
|
|
| Seattle Center Coliseum 13,174
| 4–11
|- bgcolor=#fcc
| 16
| November 14
| @ Chicago
| L 80–97
| Spencer Haywood (20)
|
|
| Chicago Stadium 7,894
| 4–12
|- bgcolor=#fcc
| 17
| November 15
| @ Kansas City–Omaha
| L 97–106
| Spencer Haywood (27)
|
|
| Municipal Auditorium 4,364
| 4–13
|- bgcolor=#cfc
| 18
| November 17
| Philadelphia
| W 105–92
| Spencer Haywood (29)
|
|
| Seattle Center Coliseum 7,762
| 5–13
|- bgcolor=#cfc
| 19
| November 18
| @ Portland
| W 102–100
| Spencer Haywood (21)
|
|
| Memorial Coliseum9,639
| 6–13
|- bgcolor=#cfc
| 20
| November 19
| Buffalo
| W 107–84
| Spencer Haywood (26)
|
|
| Seattle Center Coliseum 6,587
| 7–13
|- bgcolor=#fcc
| 21
| November 21
| @ Cleveland
| L 88–98
| Spencer Haywood (32)
|
|
| Cleveland Arena2,864
| 7–14
|- bgcolor=#fcc
| 22
| November 22
| @ Baltimore
| L 90–112
| Dick Snyder (21)
|
|
| Baltimore Civic Center 2,877
| 7–15
|- bgcolor=#fcc
| 23
| November 23
| @ Atlanta
| L 97–110
| Spencer Haywood (29)
|
|
| Omni Coliseum 6,523
| 7–16
|- bgcolor=#fcc
| 24
| November 25
| @ Houston
| L 109–114
| Spencer Haywood (38)
|
|
| Hofheinz Pavilion2,912
| 7–17
|- bgcolor=#cfc
| 25
| November 26
| Detroit
| W  103–96
| Spencer Haywood (39)
|
|
| Seattle Center Coliseum7,980
| 8–17
|- bgcolor=#fcc
| 26
| November 29
| @ Boston
| L 98–120
| Spencer Haywood (29)
|
|
| Boston Garden5,263
| 8–18

|- bgcolor=#fcc
| 27
| December 1
| @ Buffalo
| L 90–93
| Spencer Haywood, Dick Snyder (15)
|
|
| Seattle Center Coliseum16,107
| 8–19
|- bgcolor=#fcc
| 28
| December 2
| @ Chicago
| L 80–89
| Spencer Haywood (26)
|
|
| Chicago Stadium8,030
| 8–20
|- bgcolor=#fcc
| 29
| December 3
| @ Cleveland
| L 103–105 (OT)
| Spencer Haywood (29)
|
|
| Cleveland Arena2,957
| 8–21
|- bgcolor=#cfc
| 30
| December 6
| Milwaukee
| W 95–91
| Spencer Haywood (32)
|
|
| Seattle Center Coliseum8,953
| 9–21
|- bgcolor=#fcc
| 31
| December 8
| @ Los Angeles
| L 100–119
| Spencer Haywood (26)
|
|
| The Forum14,618
| 9–22
|- bgcolor=#cfc
| 32
| December 10
| Phoenix
| W 110–102
| Spencer Haywood (32)
|
|
| Seattle Center Coliseum10,628
| 10–22
|- bgcolor=#fcc
| 33
| December 13
| Milwaukee
| L 103–104 (OT)
| Spencer Haywood (38)
|
|
| Seattle Center Coliseum8,036
| 10–23
|- bgcolor=#fcc
| 34
| December 15
| Portland
| L 95–96
| Spencer Haywood (37)
|
|
| Seattle Center Coliseum7,812
| 10–24
|- bgcolor=#fcc
| 35
| December 17
| Boston
| L 98–123
| Spencer Haywood (34)
|
|
| Seattle Center Coliseum10,633
| 10–25
|- bgcolor=#fcc
| 36
| December 19
| @ Milwaukee
| L 77–121
| John Brisker (15)
|
|
| Milwaukee Arena 7,407
| 10–26
|- bgcolor=#fcc
| 37
| December 20
| @ Kansas City–Omaha
| L 110–121
| Isaac Stallworth (32)
|
|
| Omaha, NE4,067
| 10–27
|- bgcolor=#fcc
| 38
| December 22
 | @ Detroit
| L 97–109
| Fred Brown (21)
|
|
| Cobo Arena3,779
| 10–28
|- bgcolor=#fcc
| 39
| December 25
| @ Portland
| L 113–116
| Spencer Haywood (35)
|
|
| Memorial Coliseum6,818
| 10–29
|- bgcolor=#cfc
| 40
| December 26
| @ Golden State
| W 97–95
| Spencer Haywood (42)
|
|
| Oakland–Alameda County Coliseum Arena3,605
| 11–29
|- bgcolor=#cfc
| 41
| December 29
| Cleveland
| W 99–91
| Spencer Haywood (31)
|
|
| Seattle Center Coliseum12,738
| 12–29

|- bgcolor=#fcc
| 42
| January 1
| Los Angeles
| L 103–108
| Spencer Haywood (28)
|
|
| Seattle Center Coliseum8,751
| 12–30
|- bgcolor=#cfc
| 43
| January 3
| Kansas City–Omaha
| W 107–100
| Spencer Haywood (51)
|
|
| Seattle Center Coliseum10,266
| 13–30
|- bgcolor=#fcc
| 44
| January 5
| Golden State
| L 96–128
| Fred Brown (20)
|
|
| Seattle Center Coliseum 9,087
| 13–31
|- bgcolor=#fcc
| 45
| January 7
| Philadelphia
| L 82–85
| Spencer Haywood (18)
|
|
| Seattle Center Coliseum12,150
| 13–32
|- bgcolor=#fcc
| 46
| January 10
| Baltimore
| L 86–98
| Spencer Haywood (17)
|
|
| Seattle Center Coliseum7,570
| 13–33
|- bgcolor=#cfc
| 47
| January 12
| Detroit
| W 113–104
| Spencer Haywood (36)
|
|
| Seattle Center Coliseum8,420
| 14–33
|- bgcolor=#fcc
| 48
| January 14
| New York Knicks
| L 84–86
| Spencer Haywood (18)
|
|
| Seattle Center Coliseum11,538
| 14–34
|- bgcolor=#cfc
| 49
| January 16
| @ Kansas City–Omaha
| W 125–122
| Jim Fox, Spencer Haywood (23)
|
|
| Municipal Auditorium4,468
| 15–34
|- bgcolor=#cfc
| 50
| January 17
| @ Detroit
| W  106–104
| Spencer Haywood (28)
|
|
| Cobo Arena2,630
| 16–34
|- bgcolor=#fcc
| 51
| January 19
| @ Boston
| L 104–124
| Spencer Haywood (25)
|
|
| Boston Garden14,190
| 16–35
|- bgcolor=#fcc
| 52
| January 20
| Baltimore
| L 106–126
| Spencer Haywood (28)
|
|
| College Park, MD12,084
| 16–36
|- bgcolor=#fcc
| 53
| January 25
| @ Phoenix
| L 109–112
| Spencer Haywood (27)
|
|
| Arizona Veterans Memorial Coliseum5,701
| 16–37
|- bgcolor=#fcc
| 54
| January 28
| @ Los Angeles
| L 94–130
| Spencer Haywood (29)
|
|
| The Forum17,107
| 16–38
|- bgcolor=#cfc
| 55
| January 31
| Houston
| W 118–109
| Spencer Haywood (37)
|
|
| Seattle Center Coliseum6,257
| 17–38

|- bgcolor=#cfc
| 56
| February 2
| Chicago
| W 118–104
| John Brisker (24)
|
|
| Seattle Center Coliseum8,818
| 18–38
|- bgcolor=#fcc
| 57
| February 3
| @ Golden State
| L 101–123
| Spencer Haywood (34)
|
|
| Oakland–Alameda County Coliseum Arena3,261
| 18–39
|- bgcolor=#fcc
| 58
| February 4
| Kansas City–Omaha
| L 98–120
| Spencer Haywood (27)
|
|
| Seattle Center Coliseum11,140
| 18–40
|- bgcolor=#cfc
| 59
| February 6
| @ Portland
| W 118–117
| Spencer Haywood (41)
|
|
| Memorial Coliseum4,755
| 19–40
|- bgcolor=#fcc
| 60
| February 8
| @ Phoenix
| L 112–125
| Spencer Haywood (31)
|
|
| Arizona Veterans Memorial Coliseum7,084
| 19–41
|- bgcolor=#fcc
| 61
| February 11
| Buffalo
| L 125–128
| Spencer Haywood (40)
|
|
| Seattle Center Coliseum6,960
| 19–42
|- bgcolor=#fcc
| 62
| February 13
| @ Los Angeles
| L 98–101
| Spencer Haywood (35)
|
|
| The Forum13,127
| 19–43
|- bgcolor=#fcc
| 63
| February 14
| Baltimore
| L 106–107
| Spencer Haywood (37)
|
|
| Seattle Center Coliseum6,034
| 19–44
|- bgcolor=#cfc
| 64
| February 16
| Golden State
| W 114–108 (OT)
| Fred Brown (33)
|
|
| Seattle Center Coliseum9,070
| 20–44
|- bgcolor=#fcc
| 65
| February 18
| Boston
| L 105–106
| Spencer Haywood (32)
|
|
| Seattle Center Coliseum12,905
| 20–45
|- bgcolor=#fcc
| 66
| February 21
| Houston
| L 107–139
| Spencer Haywood (27)
|
|
| San Antonio, TX4,179
| 20–46
|- bgcolor=#cfc
| 67
| February 23
| Atlanta
| W 124–120
| Spencer Haywood (29)
|
|
| Seattle Center Coliseum11,735
| 21–46
|- bgcolor=#fcc
| 68
| February 25
| Chicago
| L 85–88
| Spencer Haywood (29)
|
|
| Seattle Center Coliseum10,103
| 21–47
|- bgcolor=#fcc
| 69
| February 27
| @ Atlanta
| L 130–131
| Spencer Haywood (33)
|
|
| Omni Coliseum8,295
| 21–48
|- bgcolor=#fcc
| 70
| February 28
| @ Milwaukee
| L 110–124
| Spencer Haywood (36)
|
|
| Milwaukee Arena10,292
| 21–49

|- bgcolor=#cfc
| 71
| March 2
| @ Buffalo
| W 139–120
| Spencer Haywood (35)
|
|
| Seattle Center Coliseum5,563
| 22–49
|- bgcolor=#cfc
| 72
| March 3
| @ Detroit
| W 115–113
| Spencer Haywood (33)
|
|
| Cobo Arena5,044
| 23–49
|- bgcolor=#fcc
| 73
| March 6
| @ New York
| L 94–106
| Spencer Haywood (25)
|
|
| Madison Square Garden19,644
| 23–50
|- bgcolor=#cfc
| 74
| March 10
| @ Philadelphia
| W 106–96
| Spencer Haywood (27)
|
|
| The Spectrum4,942
| 24–50
|- bgcolor=#fcc
| 75
| March 13
| @ Chicago
| L 89–104
| Spencer Haywood (31)
|
|
| Chicago Stadium9,270
| 24–51
|- bgcolor=#cfc
| 76
| March 16
| Golden State
| W 116–106
| Spencer Haywood (35)
|
|
| Seattle Center Coliseum10,512
| 25–51
|- bgcolor=#cfc
| 77
| March 18
| Houston
| W 121–112
| Spencer Haywood (38)
|
|
| Seattle Center Coliseum8,956
| 26–51
|- bgcolor=#fcc
| 78
| March 20
| @ Golden State
| L 106–114
| Spencer Haywood (39)
|
|
| Oakland–Alameda County Coliseum Arena2,992
| 26–52
|- bgcolor=#fcc
| 79
| March 21
| Milwaukee
| L 96–119
| Spencer Haywood (29)
|
|
| Seattle Center Coliseum11,407
| 26–53
|- bgcolor=#fcc
| 80
| March 23
| Portland
| L 112–118
| Kennedy McIntosh (25)
|
|
| Seattle Center Coliseum10,305
| 26–54
|- bgcolor=#fcc
| 81
| March 25
| Los Angeles
| L 93–109
| Spencer Haywood (25)
|
|
| Seattle Center Coliseum13,180
| 26–55
|- bgcolor=#fcc
| 82
| March 28
| Phoenix
| L 125–127
| John Brisker (39)
|
|
| Seattle Center Coliseum11,246
| 26–56

Player statistics

Awards and records
 Spencer Haywood was selected to the All-NBA First Team for the second time.

Transactions

Overview

Trades

References

Seattle
Seattle SuperSonics seasons